The Dundee Madsons are a basketball club based in the Menzieshill area of the city of Dundee, Scotland. The club was founded as Menzieshill B.C. in 1964.   The club's most notable former player is Harry Morrice, who plays centre for the North Carolina A&T Aggies men's basketball team in NCAA Division I. 
The senior men's team competed in the Scottish Men's National League from 1974 to 1980, and re-entered the Scottish National League Division 2 in 2021.

References

Basketball teams in Scotland
1964 establishments in Scotland
Sport in Dundee
Basketball teams established in 1964